David English is an Irish hurler who plays in midfield for the Carlow senior team.
In the 2013 Leinster Senior Hurling Championship, English scored 10 points against Wexford in a 2-16 to 0-20 defeat.

References

Living people
Carlow inter-county hurlers
Year of birth missing (living people)
Place of birth missing (living people)